Beury may refer to:

Beury Mountain Wildlife Management Area, West Virginia
Beury, West Virginia
National Bank of North Philadelphia in Philadelphia, Pennsylvania, also known at the Beury Building

People with the surname
Charles Ezra Beury (1879–1953), the second president of Temple University